Llewellyn Classen is a South African rugby union player for the  in the Currie Cup. His regular position is hooker.

Classen was named in the  squad for the 2021 Currie Cup Premier Division.

References

South African rugby union players
Living people
Rugby union hookers
Blue Bulls players
1999 births
Pumas (Currie Cup) players